Die Without Hope is the fifth studio album by American deathcore band Carnifex. It was made in Audiohammer Studios in Sanford, Florida and was produced by Mark Lewis (no relation to vocalist Scott Lewis). The album was released on March 4, 2014. The song "Dragged into the Grave" was released as Carnifex's first single on January 16, 2014. On February 3, the band streamed a second song titled, "Condemned to Decay" on Nuclear Blast's YouTube channel. It is the band's first album to feature lead guitarist Jordan Lockrey.

Critical reception 

Die Without Hope garnered critical acclaim from music critics. Metacritic, a website that scores albums based on a weighted average from selected ratings and reviews, gave a Metascore of an 81 out of 100 indicating "universal acclaim". At Alternative Press, Dan Slessor rated the album four stars out of five, stating that because of their short hiatus the release "seems to have energized them–and then some." In addition, Slessor adds that "With so much competition to garner the deathcore audience, Carnifex make it darn clear they are ready to fight tooth and nail for what is rightfully theirs." Amy Sciarretto of Outburn rated the album an eight out of ten, writing that on the release they band are "letting out plenty of blood soaked roars and musical brutality" on which it "will surely induce maximum headbanging, but it's not for marginal or mainstream metal fans." At Rock Sound, Jack Rogers rated the album a nine out of ten, saying that "it’s clear that Carnifex have firmly reclaimed their rightful place back on the throne" because the release "shows them at their most uncompromising, bleak and arse-splittingly heavy." Bradley Zorgdrager of Exclaim! rated the album a seven out of a ten, and according to him the release comes "With impressive growth, and while still operating within the genre's tight confines, Carnifex put the final nail in deathcore's coffin, giving it an appropriate sendoff."

Track listing

Personnel 
Writing, performance and production credits are adapted from the album liner notes.

Carnifex
 Scott Lewis – vocals
 Jordan Lockrey – lead guitar
 Cory Arford – rhythm guitar
 Fred Calderon – bass
 Shawn Cameron – drums, keyboards

Additional musicians
 Mark Lewis – guitar solo on "Salvation Is Dead" and "Dark Days"
 Jason Suecof – guitar solo on "Hatred and Slaughter"
 Cassie Morris (Unicorn Death) – piano, programming

Production
 Mark Lewis – production, engineering, mixing, mastering
 Eyal Levi – digital editing, drum assistant
 Godmachine –  cover
 Marcelo Vasco – layout

Charts

References

External links 
 
 Die Without Hope at Nuclear Blast

2014 albums
Albums produced by Mark Lewis (music producer)
Carnifex (band) albums
Nuclear Blast albums